Miranda is a 2002 British comedy film starring Christina Ricci, Kyle MacLachlan, John Simm, John Hurt, Tamsin Greig and Julian Rhind-Tutt. The film is classified as a romance/thriller by IMDb.

Plot
Frank (Simm), a librarian in the United Kingdom, falls in love with a mysterious American dancer named Miranda (Ricci). Frank appears naive, but his character is as complex as Miranda's.  Graphic scenes of sex and seduction illustrate Frank's fantasy and unrealistic love for Miranda. She suddenly disappears, and he tracks her down in London, discovering she is actually a con artist. He leaves her, returning to Northern England.

Miranda and her boss (Hurt), who not so secretly "loves" her, are in business selling buildings that they don't own to unwitting customers. These buildings are really being prepared for demolition. In one scene in which Miranda is negotiating the sale of a warehouse with Nailor (MacLachlan), Nailor sees men putting down cable around the building. He asked Miranda what were they doing and she replies that they are putting in cable TV when, in fact, they are preparing the warehouse for demolition. After making a big score, by successfully conning Nailor to buy the warehouse, her boss leaves her, and Nailor seeks revenge against Miranda.

Frank realizes that he should not have left her, and returns to London, with a very quirky friend who is instrumental in saving Miranda from a knife-wielding Nailor.  While Frank's friend distracts Nailor with fancy jiu-jitsu moves, Frank slams a table over Nailor's head. The film ends in comic relief with Frank and Miranda living the good life off Miranda's ill-gotten gains.

Cast
 Christina Ricci
 John Simm
 Kyle MacLachlan
 John Hurt
 Julian Rhind-Tutt
 Matthew Marsh
 Pik Sen Lim
 Joanne Froggatt
 Cavan Clerkin
 Tamsin Greig
 Ryozo Kohira
 Dennis Matsuki
 Carol Sua

Filming locations
Filmed on location in London and Scarborough.

Critical reception
BBC Movies review labelled the film as a "limp, homegrown romantic comedy" and "a soul-sapping stinker'. The Radio Times listed the film as being a Comedy-Romance "but featuring little of either" and describing the film as a "dull British embarrassment" with "one of Christina Ricci's worst performances to date".

References

External links

British crime films
British erotic thriller films
2000s erotic thriller films
2002 films
Scarborough, North Yorkshire
Films set in Yorkshire
Films shot in North Yorkshire
Films shot at Pinewood Studios
2002 directorial debut films
2000s English-language films
2000s British films